Vachellia kirkii, widely known as Acacia kirkii but now attributed to the genus Vachellia, is a tree native to tropical Africa. It is commonly known as the flood plain acacia.

Vachellia kirkii is a multi-trunked shrub or tree. It has a spreading, flat-topped crown, growing from 2.5 to 15 meters in height, and occasionally to 18 meters.

Vachellia kirkii ranges across tropical Africa, from Guinea through Mali, the DR Congo, Uganda, Kenya, Burundi, Rwanda, Tanzania, Angola, Zambia, and Zimbabwe.

Its habitat includes woodland, savanna, and mixed scrubland. It occurs often in seasonally-flooded areas near rivers and lakes, including groundwater forests, swamp forests, and flooded savannas, on nutrient-rich silty and clay soils. It ranges in elevation from sea level to 1,980 metres.

The species is named for John Kirk, who accompanied David Livingstone on his 1858 Zambezi expedition.

References 

kirkii
Trees of Africa